Killjoy is the second full-length album released by New Zealand rock band Shihad. This album was released in May 1995.

It is their first album to go gold in New Zealand. It is widely regarded as a classic New Zealand rock album.

According to MTV, Iggy Pop and the members of metal band Metallica have both highly praised this album.

Track listing
 "You Again" - 4:37
 "Gimme Gimme" - 5:17
 "The Call" - 5:13
 "Envy" - 3:54
 "Deb’s Night Out" - 3:37
 "Bitter" - 4:12
 "For What You Burn" - 5:43
 "Silvercup" - 5:03
 "Get Up" - 4:11

The Japanese version included an extra track called "N.I.L." This track was also included as a bonus track on the 20th Anniversary remaster of Killjoy released in 2015.

Credits
 All songs by: Shihad
 Produced by: Shihad & Malcolm Welsford
 Assistant Engineer: Nick Treacy
 Recorded and Mixed by: Malcolm Welsford
 Digital Editing: Evan Robertson
 Additional Percussion: DLT

Awards 
The album won Best Album at the 1996 New Zealand Music Awards.

Certifications

References

1995 albums
Shihad albums